Julie Rosewald (1847–1906), called “Cantor Soprano” by her congregation, was America's first unofficial (due to the fact that she was female and not ordained) cantor, serving San Francisco's Temple Emanu-El from 1884 until 1893.

Biography
She was an opera singer, born in Germany, and in 1884 she moved to San Francisco with her husband. Cantor Max Wolff died, and someone was needed to replace him who was familiar with Jewish liturgy, Hebrew and music, and could be ready to conduct High Holy Day services in three weeks. Rosewald was chosen, conducted High Holy Day services that year, and served the temple as cantor until 1893. As cantor she sang the solo parts in the services, chose and directed the music at the synagogue, directed choir rehearsals, and collaborated with the organist.

Death
She is buried in Colma, California.

References

Further reading

External links
 portrait of Julie Rosewald(AlexanderStreet; North American Theatre Online)

Women hazzans
1847 births
1906 deaths
Jewish American musicians
People from San Francisco
Religious leaders from the San Francisco Bay Area
19th-century American women singers
19th-century American singers
Burials at Hills of Eternity Memorial Park